Elbert "Babe" Stapp (February 26, 1904 in San Antonio, Texas – September 17, 1980 in Indianapolis, Indiana) was an American racecar driver active in the 1920s and 1930s. He also was a member of the infamous Thirteen Black Cats (1924).

Career award
He was inducted in the National Sprint Car Hall of Fame in 1994.

Indianapolis 500 results

Stapp's finishes from 1927 – 1938 rank as the worst ten-race finishing streak in Indy 500 history.

References

1904 births
1980 deaths
Indianapolis 500 drivers
National Sprint Car Hall of Fame inductees
Stapp Babe
Racing drivers from San Antonio
Racing drivers from Texas
AAA Championship Car drivers